East Row Historic District is the second largest Historic District in the Commonwealth of Kentucky. It is located in Newport, Kentucky. The East Row was created by joining two of Newport's Historic Neighborhoods; Mansion Hill and Gateway.

General James Taylor Jr. pioneered Newport in the 1790s on  inherited from his father. His father, James Taylor Sr., bought  of land in Northern Kentucky from his friend George Muse, which was part of the land Muse had been awarded for his military service in the French and Indian War.
James Taylor Jr. brought to Newport his wealthy new wife Keturah Moss Leitch.

Well-connected with Washington politics, The Taylor family had two cousins, James Madison and Zachary Taylor, who later become presidents of the United States. The Taylors brought colonial culture to Northern Kentucky.

Taylor choose a high hill overlooking the Ohio River to build his large home (Bellevue, still standing today) in the Greek Revival style. At his death in 1848, James Taylor Jr. was said to be one of the wealthiest men in the state of Kentucky, with an estate valued at more than $4 million.

In the mid-19th century, Newport became a hub for trade, industry and culture. The Victorian era was Newport's most affluent period, as is evident by the East Row's elegant houses, which look much as they did more than 100 years ago. The establishment of the East Row was made possible when, motivated by Newport's rapid growth, the grandson of Gen. James Taylor decided to subdivide the family's estate as Taylor's Row Addition. The area became a favorite of wealthy business owners and merchants in the late 19th century.
East Row Historic District is home to 1,070 homes and is Kentucky's second largest historic district. All buildings in East Row have the distinction of being listed on the National Register of Historic Places. Early houses, near the western edge of the district, were built in the Italianate style, later homes were built in Queen Anne, the Colonial Revival and American Foursquare style.

By the late 1970s the Neighborhood had fallen on hard times, Many of the large homes were cut into many small apartments. Property prices were low and the neighborhood became attractive to urban pioneers. The Mansion Hill Neighborhood Association was founded in 1979. Owners started to restore the many beautiful homes and expose the former beauty. The Mansion Hill Tour was begun in 1979, attracting more resident to the Neighborhood. In the early 1980s, many of the most active Historic Preservationists lived in the Gateway neighborhood, the two neighborhoods combined forces in the mid-1980s.

Just blocks away from East Row, the city's riverfront and northern business district are undergoing dramatic redevelopment, with Riverboat Row and Newport on the Levee already a thriving riverfront district of restaurants and clubs. With the World Peace Bell and the Newport Aquarium just steps away from the Historic District.

In mid-2006 the Newport City Commission expanded the Historic District, including the north side of Second Street, The west side of Washington  Avenue and the 200 block of East Fourth Street. East Fourth Street has several American Civil War era homes, including some in the Greek Revival style.

References

East Row Site

External links
Hanaford Condos
Central Christian Church
Postcard Nelson Place
Notre Dame Academy
Maple Avenue
Virginia flats, 3rd & Washington
St. Mark's Lutheran Church
Park Avenue
Fourth and Park
Park Avenue School
Third and Washington Avenue

Historic districts on the National Register of Historic Places in Kentucky
Newport, Kentucky
National Register of Historic Places in Campbell County, Kentucky
Geography of Campbell County, Kentucky